Cotopaxi is an 1862 oil painting by the Hudson River School artist Frederic Edwin Church. The work was commissioned by well-known philanthropist James Lenox. The painting was met with great acclaim, and seen as a parable of the Civil War, then raging in the South, with its casting of light against darkness. The painting depicts Cotopaxi, a volcano that is also the second highest peak in modern-day Ecuador, spewing smoke and ash across a sunrise. Church also painted another landscape in 1855 by the same name that also features the volcano in the distance, which is on display at the Museum of Fine Arts, Houston.

See also
List of works by Frederic Edwin Church

References

Paintings by Frederic Edwin Church
1862 paintings
Water in art
Sun in art